B.P. Poddar Institute of Management and Technology or BPPIMT is an undergraduate college in West Bengal, India. It was established in 1999 by B.P. Poddar Foundation for Education. The college is affiliated with Maulana Abul Kalam Azad University of Technology and all the programmes are approved by the All India Council for Technical Education and the courses C.S.E., E.C.E., E.E., I.T. are accredited by NBA (National Board of Accreditation).

The engineering campus is located at VIP Road, near Haldirams, Kolkata. It has a second campus in Sector V, Salt Lake which specializes in offering undergraduate programmes in the field of Management and Technology.

Academics 
The institute offers six under-graduate courses:-

B.Tech in Electronics and Communication Engineering (ECE) - 4 years [Approved intake - 120]
B.Tech in Electrical Engineering (EE) - 4 years [Approved intake - 60]
B.Tech in Computer Science and Engineering (CSE) - 4 years [Approved intake - 120]
B.Tech in Information Technology (IT) - 4 years [Approved intake - 60]
BCA - 3 years [Approved intake - 90]
BBA - 3 years [Approved intake - 120]

The institute offers one post-graduate course:-

 Masters in Computer Application - 3 years [Approved intake - 40]

Department of Electronics & Communication Engineering (ECE) 
The Department offers education at Undergraduate Level in the areas of Electronics and Communication. The Department also provides support to all other Engineering Departments for their classes on Electronics and Communication based courses.

Facilities 
CURRICULUM LABORATORY

Department has well equipped Labs with Research facilities. Few of those are:

 EM Theory & Antenna Lab
 Advance Communication Lab sponsored by AICTE under MODROB fund.
 Microprocessor & Microcontroller Lab
 DSP Lab
 VLSI Circuits & Systems Lab
 Project Lab
 Computer lab with state of art PCs connected in LAN and high-speed internet connection.

DEPARTMENTAL LIBRARY

The department is equipped with the library with Text books, Reference books, technical magazines, Journals and e-journals.

INNOVATION LAB

Embedded system and IOT lab (Texas Instrument Innovation Lab), Setup by Digital Shark Technology, Bangalore, University Program Partner TI.

Student chapter 
SPIE, BPPIMT

 2nd largest student chapter of Asia.
 SPIE supports its members financially and technically.
 Student Chapter receives $750 as a grant to organize different activities.
 Students get chance to go abroad to attend conferences.
 Organized various events like Seminar, Conference, Industrial Visit, school awareness program, Technical quiz (Abhigyan), Model Competition etc.

See also

References

External links 
College Website:
http://www.bppimt.ac.in

Business schools in Kolkata
Educational institutions established in 1999
Colleges affiliated to West Bengal University of Technology
1999 establishments in West Bengal
Engineering colleges in Kolkata